Mohammadabad-e Gaft (also Romanized as Moḩammadābād-e Gaft; also known as Moḩammadābād) is a village in Pain Jovin Rural District, Helali District, Joghatai County, Razavi Khorasan Province, Iran. At the 2006 census, its population was 2,600, in 691 families.

References 

Populated places in Joghatai County